Yasser Mahmoud Hujirat (born December 19, 1965) is an Arab Israeli geneticist and politician who was elected to the Knesset for the United Arab List in the 2022 elections.

Political career 
He was placed in the fifth slot of the electoral list of the United Arab List following primaries that were held in August 2022.

References

See also 
 List of members of the twenty-fifth Knesset

1965 births
Living people
United Arab List politicians
Members of the 25th Knesset (2022–)
21st-century Israeli politicians
Arab politicians in Israel
Arab members of the Knesset
Islamic Movement in Israel politicians
Hebrew University of Jerusalem alumni
Israeli geneticists